Hester Bekker is a former international lawn and indoor bowls competitor for South Africa.

Bowls career
In 1996, Bekker won the gold medal in the triples at the 1996 World Outdoor Bowls Championship in Adelaide. Four years later, Bekker just missed out on a bronze medal after losing the triples bronze play off match in Moama.

She was part of the fours team that won the gold medal at both the 1994 Commonwealth Games, it was the first time that South Africa had won a gold medal since 1958, following the return from their Anti-Apartheid Movement Commonwealth ban enforced in 1961.

She won another gold at the 1998 Commonwealth Games.

Bekker has won five medals at the Atlantic Bowls Championships. In 1995 she won triples gold medal and fours silver medal in her home country. Two years later in 1997 she won the fours gold medal in Wales before winning two more medals in Cape Town during 1999, including a third Atlantic Championships gold.

References

Living people
Date of birth missing (living people)
Bowls players at the 1994 Commonwealth Games
Bowls players at the 1998 Commonwealth Games
Commonwealth Games gold medallists for South Africa
Commonwealth Games medallists in lawn bowls
South African female bowls players
Bowls World Champions
Year of birth missing (living people)
Medallists at the 1994 Commonwealth Games
Medallists at the 1998 Commonwealth Games